Pirmin Lang (born 25 November 1984) is a Swiss former racing cyclist. He rode in the 2014 Vuelta a España.

In February 2020, he publicly confessed to having used illegal performance enhancing drugs during his career as part of the "Aderlass" network and resigned from his role as Head of Sport at the  team.

Major results

2008
 3rd Tour du Jura
2009
 6th Tour du Jura
 10th Ronde van Noord-Holland
2010
 3rd Road race, National Road Championships
 4th Overall Oberösterreich Rundfahrt
 5th Overall Cinturón a Mallorca
2011
 1st Antwerpse Havenpijl
 3rd Grand Prix des Marbriers
 5th Grand Prix de la Ville de Lillers
 6th Time trial, National Road Championships
 6th Overall Tour de Bretagne
 9th GP du canton d'Argovie
2012
 1st Stage 1 Boucles de la Mayenne
 4th Road race, National Road Championships
 4th Overall An Post Rás
1st Stage 2
2013
 7th Val d'Ille Classic
2014
 3rd Tour de Berne
2016
 2nd Road race, National Road Championships

References

External links

1984 births
Living people
People from Willisau District
Swiss male cyclists
Sportspeople from the canton of Lucerne
Doping cases in cycling